Kenji Giovanni Cabrera Nakamura (born 27 January 2003) is a Peruvian footballer of Japanese descent who plays as a midfielder for FBC Melgar.

Club career
Born in Shiga, Japan, Cabrera started his career with Esther Grande, before a short spell in the Alianza Lima academy. He joined FBC Melgar in 2021, immediately being promoted to the first team, making his debut the same year.

International career
Cabrera has represented Peru at under-20 level.

Career statistics

Club

Notes

References

2003 births
Living people
Association football people from Shiga Prefecture
Peruvian people of Japanese descent
Peruvian footballers
Peru youth international footballers
Japanese footballers
Association football midfielders
Esther Grande footballers
Club Alianza Lima footballers
FBC Melgar footballers